The 2009–10 Washington Capitals season was the team's 36th season in the National Hockey League (NHL). The season started with the 2009 NHL Entry Draft on June 26–27 with the Capitals holding the 24th selection in the draft.

Pre-season

Regular season 
On December 28, the Capitals traded captain Chris Clark and Milan Jurcina to the Columbus Blue Jackets in exchange for Jason Chimera. On January 5, Alexander Ovechkin was named the team's new captain, the unanimous choice of his teammates.

From January 13 to February 7, 2010, Washington won 14-straight games.

By finishing the regular season with 121 points in the standings, the Capitals became the first non-Original Six team to ever reach the 120-point plateau.

The Capitals finished the regular season in first place in scoring, with 313 goals (excluding five shootout-winning goals). This was the highest total by an NHL team since the 1995–96 season. Seven Washington players reached the 20-goal mark. The Capitals also scored the most power-play goals in the league with 79, and had the best power-play percentage at 25.24% (79 for 313).

Divisional standings

Conference standings

Game log 

|- align="center" bgcolor="#ccffcc"
| 1 || October 1 || Boston Bruins || 4 - 1 || TD Garden || 17,565 || 1-0-0 || 2
|- align="center" bgcolor="#ccffcc"
| 2 || October 3 || Toronto Maple Leafs || 6 - 4 || Verizon Center || 18,277 || 2-0-0 || 4
|- align="center" bgcolor="ffffff"
| 3 || October 6 || Philadelphia Flyers || 6 - 5 OT || Wachovia Center || 19,567 || 2-0-1 || 5
|- align="center" bgcolor="#ffbbbb"
| 4 || October 8 || New York Rangers || 4 - 3 || Verizon Center || 18,277 || 2-1-1 || 5
|- align="center" bgcolor="#ffbbbb"
| 5 || October 10 || Detroit Red Wings || 3 - 2 || Joe Louis Arena || 19,122 || 2-2-1 || 5
|- align="center" bgcolor="ffffff"
| 6 || October 12 || New Jersey Devils || 3 - 2 SO || Verizon Center || 18,277 || 2-2-2 || 6
|- align="center" bgcolor="ccffcc"
| 7 || October 15 || San Jose Sharks || 4 - 1 || Verizon Center || 18,277 || 3-2-2 || 8
|- align="center" bgcolor="ccffcc"
| 8 || October 17 || Nashville Predators || 3 - 2 SO || Verizon Center || 18,277 || 4-2-2 || 10
|- align="center" bgcolor="ccffcc"
| 9 || October 22 || Atlanta Thrashers || 5 - 4 || Philips Arena || 13,192 || 5-2-2 || 12
|- align="center" bgcolor="ccffcc"
| 10 || October 24 || New York Islanders || 3 - 2 OT || Nassau Veterans Memorial Coliseum || 11,541 || 6-2-2 || 14
|- align="center" bgcolor="ccffcc"
| 11 || October 27 || Philadelphia Flyers || 4 - 2 || Verizon Center || 18,277 || 7-2-2 || 16
|- align="center" bgcolor="ccffcc"
| 12 || October 29 || Atlanta Thrashers || 4 - 3 || Philips Arena || 12,893 || 8-2-2 || 18
|- align="center" bgcolor="ffffff"
| 13 || October 30 || New York Islanders || 4 - 3 OT || Verizon Center || 18,277 || 8-2-3 || 19
|-

|- align="center" bgcolor="#ffffff"
| 14 || November 1 || Columbus Blue Jackets || 4 - 5 OT || Verizon Center ||18,277 || 8-2-4 || 20
|- align="center" bgcolor="#ffbbbb"
| 15 || November 4 || New Jersey Devils || 2 - 3 || Prudential Center || 13,498 || 8-3-4 || 20
|- align="center" bgcolor="#ccffcc"
| 16 || November 6 || Florida Panthers ||4 - 1  || BankAtlantic Center ||15,877 || 9-3-4 || 22
|- align="center" bgcolor="#ccffcc"
| 17 || November 7 || Florida Panthers || 7 - 4 || Verizon Center || 18,277 || 10-3-4 || 24
|- align="center" bgcolor="#ccffcc"
| 18 || November 11 || New York Islanders ||5 - 4 SO || Verizon Center ||18,277 || 11-3-4 || 26
|- align="center" bgcolor="#ccffcc"
| 19 || November 13 || Minnesota Wild ||3 - 1 || Verizon Center ||18,277  || 12-3-4 || 28
|- align="center" bgcolor="ffbbbb"
| 20 || November 14 || New Jersey Devils || 2 - 5 || Prudential Center || 16,521 || 12-4-4 || 28
|- align="center" bgcolor="#ccffcc"
| 21 || November 17 || New York Rangers || 4 - 2 || Madison Square Garden ||18,200  || 13-4-4 || 30
|- align="center" bgcolor="#ffbbbb"
| 22 || November 20 || Montreal Canadiens || 2 - 3 || Verizon Center ||18,277  || 13-5-4 || 30
|- align="center" bgcolor="#ffffff"
| 23 || November 21 || Toronto Maple Leafs || 1 - 2 SO || Air Canada Centre ||19,455  || 13-5-5 || 31
|- align="center" bgcolor="#ffffff"
| 24 || November 23 || Ottawa Senators || 3 - 4 OT || Scotiabank Place ||16,210  || 13-5-6 || 32
|- align="center" bgcolor="#ccffcc"
| 25 || November 25 || Buffalo Sabres || 2 - 0 || Verizon Center ||18,277  || 14-5-6 || 34
|- align="center" bgcolor="#ccffcc"
| 26 || November 28 || Montreal Canadiens || 4 - 3 SO || Bell Centre ||21,273  || 15-5-6 || 36
|- align="center" bgcolor="#ccffcc"
| 27 || November 30 || Carolina Hurricanes || 3 - 2 || RBC Center || 12,797 || 16-5-6 || 38
|-

|- align="center" bgcolor="#ccffcc"
| 28 || December 3 || Florida Panthers || 6 - 2  || Verizon Center ||18,277  || 17-5-6 || 40
|- align="center" bgcolor="#ccffcc"
| 29 || December 5 || Philadelphia Flyers || 8 - 2 || Wachovia Center ||19,789  || 18-5-6 || 42
|- align="center" bgcolor="#ccffcc"
| 30 || December 7 || Tampa Bay Lightning || 3 - 0 || St. Pete Times Forum ||12,400  || 19-5-6 || 44
|- align="center" bgcolor="#ffbbbb"
| 31 || December 9 || Buffalo Sabres || 0 - 3 || HSBC Arena ||17,982  || 19-6-6 || 44
|- align="center" bgcolor="#ccffcc"
| 32 || December 11 || Carolina Hurricanes || 4 - 3 OT || Verizon Center ||18,277  || 20-6-6 || 46
|- align="center" bgcolor="#ffbbbb"
| 33 || December 12 || Toronto Maple Leafs || 3 - 6 || Air Canada Centre ||19,316  || 20-7-6 || 46
|- align="center" bgcolor="#ccffcc"
| 34 || December 15 || Colorado Avalanche || 6 - 1 || Pepsi Center ||14,172  || 21-7-6 || 48
|- align="center" bgcolor="#ffbbbb"
| 35 || December 18 || Vancouver Canucks || 2 - 3  || GM Place ||18,810  || 21-8-6 || 48
|- align="center" bgcolor="#ccffcc"
| 36 || December 19 || Edmonton Oilers || 4 - 2  || Rexall Place ||16,839  || 22-8-6 || 50
|- align="center" bgcolor="#ccffcc"
| 37 || December 23 || Buffalo Sabres || 5 - 2 || Verizon Center ||18,277  || 23-8-6 || 52
|- align="center" bgcolor="#ccffcc"
| 38 || December 26 || New Jersey Devils || 4 - 1 || Verizon Center ||18,277  || 24-8-6 || 54
|- align="center" bgcolor="#ffbbbb"
| 39 || December 28 || Carolina Hurricanes || 3 - 6  || Verizon Center ||18,277  || 24-9-6 || 54
|- align="center" bgcolor="#ffbbbb"
| 40 || December 30 || San Jose Sharks || 2 - 5 || HP Pavilion ||17,562  || 24-10-6 || 54
|-

|- align="center" bgcolor="#ffbbbb"
| 41 || January 2 || Los Angeles Kings || 1 - 2  || Staples Center ||18,118  || 24-11-6 || 54
|- align="center" bgcolor="#ccffcc"
| 42 || January 5 || Montreal Canadiens || 4 - 2 || Verizon Center ||18,277  || 25-11-6 || 56
|- align="center" bgcolor="#ccffcc"
| 43 || January 7 || Ottawa Senators || 5 - 2  || Verizon Center || 18,277 ||26-11-6 || 58
|- align="center" bgcolor="#ccffcc"
| 44 || January 9 || Atlanta Thrashers || 8 - 1 || Philips Arena || 16,767 ||27-11-6 || 60
|- align="center" bgcolor="#ffbbbb"
| 45 || January 12 || Tampa Bay Lightning || 4 - 7 || St. Pete Times Forum ||13,891  ||27-12-6 || 60
|- align="center" bgcolor="#ccffcc"
| 46 || January 13 || Florida Panthers || 5 - 4 SO || BankAtlantic Center ||14,776 ||28-12-6 || 62
|- align="center" bgcolor="#ccffcc"
| 47 || January 15 || Toronto Maple Leafs || 6 - 1  || Verizon Center ||18,277 ||29-12-6 || 64
|- align="center" bgcolor="#ccffcc"
| 48 || January 17 || Philadelphia Flyers || 5 - 3 || Verizon Center ||18,277 ||30-12-6 || 66
|- align="center" bgcolor="#ccffcc"
| 49 || January 19 || Detroit Red Wings || 3 - 2 || Verizon Center ||18,277 ||31-12-6 || 68
|- align="center" bgcolor="#ccffcc"
| 50 || January 21 || Pittsburgh Penguins || 6 - 3 || Mellon Arena || 17,132 ||32-12-6 || 70
|- align="center" bgcolor="#ccffcc"
| 51 || January 23 || Phoenix Coyotes || 4 - 2 || Verizon Center || 18,277 ||33-12-6 || 72
|- align="center" bgcolor="#ccffcc"
| 52 || January 26 || New York Islanders ||7 - 2 || Nassau Veterans Memorial Coliseum || 12,549 ||34-12-6|| 74
|- align="center" bgcolor="#ccffcc"
| 53 || January 27 || Anaheim Ducks || 5 - 1 || Verizon Center || 18,277 ||35-12-6|| 76
|- align="center" bgcolor="#ccffcc"
| 54 || January 29 || Florida Panthers || 4 - 1  || Verizon Center || 18,277 || 36-12-6|| 78
|- align="center" bgcolor="#ccffcc"
| 55 || January 31 || Tampa Bay Lightning || 3 - 2  || Verizon Center || 18,277 || 37-12-6|| 80
|-

|- align="center" bgcolor="#ccffcc"
| 56 || February 2 || Boston Bruins || 4 - 1 || TD Garden || 17,565 || 38-12-6|| 82
|- align="center" bgcolor="#ccffcc"
| 57 || February 4 || New York Rangers || 6 - 5 || Madison Square Garden || 18,200 || 39-12-6|| 84
|- align="center" bgcolor="#ccffcc"
| 58 || February 5 || Atlanta Thrashers ||5 - 2  || Verizon Center ||18,277 || 40-12-6|| 86
|- align="center" bgcolor="#ccffcc" 
| 59 || February 7 || Pittsburgh Penguins ||5 - 4 OT  || Verizon Center ||18,277 || 41-12-6|| 88
|- align="center" bgcolor="#ffffff"
| 60 || February 10 || Montreal Canadiens || 6 - 5 OT || Bell Centre || 21,273 || 41-12-7|| 89
|- align="center" bgcolor="#ffbbbb"
| 61 || February 11 || Ottawa Senators || 6 - 5 || Scotiabank Place || 19,682 || 41-13-7 || 89
|- align="center" bgcolor="#ffffff"
| 62 || February 13 || St. Louis Blues || 4 - 3 SO || Scottrade Center || 19,150 || 41-13-8|| 90
|-

|- align="center" bgcolor="#ccffcc"
| 63 || March 3 || Buffalo Sabres || 3 - 1 || HSBC Arena ||18,690 || 42-13-8 || 92
|- align="center" bgcolor="#ccffcc"
| 64 || March 4 || Tampa Bay Lightning || 5 - 4 || Verizon Center || 18,277  || 43-13-8 || 94
|- align="center" bgcolor="#ccffcc"
| 65 || March 6 || New York Rangers || 2 - 0 || Verizon Center || 18,277 || 44-13-8 || 96
|- align="center"
| 66 || March 8 || Dallas Stars || 4 - 3 SO || Verizon Center || 18,277 || 44-13-9 || 97
|- align="center" bgcolor="#ccffcc"
| 67 || March 10 || Carolina Hurricanes || 4 - 3 OT || Verizon Center || 18,277 || 45-13-9 || 99
|- align="center" bgcolor="#ffbbbb"
| 68 || March 12 || Tampa Bay Lightning || 2 - 3 || Verizon Center || 18,277 || 45-14-9 || 99
|- align="center" bgcolor="#ccffcc"
| 69 || March 14 || Chicago Blackhawks || 4 - 3 OT || United Center || 22,289 ||46-14-9 ||101
|- align="center" bgcolor="#ccffcc"
| 70 || March 16 || Florida Panthers || 7 - 3 || BankAtlantic Center || 15,123 || 47-14-9 || 103
|- align="center"
| 71 || March 18 || Carolina Hurricanes || 3 - 4 OT || RBC Center || 18,144 || 47-14-10 || 104
|- align="center" bgcolor="#ccffcc"
| 72 || March 20 || Tampa Bay Lightning || 3 - 1 || St. Pete Times Forum || 19,844 || 48-14-10 || 106
|- align="center" bgcolor="#ccffcc"
| 73 || March 24 || Pittsburgh Penguins || 4 - 3 SO || Verizon Center || 18,277 || 49-14-10 || 108
|- align="center"
| 74 || March 25 || Carolina Hurricanes || 3 - 2 SO || RBC Center || 18,046 || 49-14-11 || 109
|- align="center" bgcolor="#ffbbbb"
| 75 || March 28 || Calgary Flames || 5 - 3 || Verizon Center || 18,277 ||49-15-11 || 109
|- align="center"
| 76 || March 30 || Ottawa Senators || 4 - 5 OT || Verizon Center || 18,277 || 49–15–12 || 110
|-

|- align="center" bgcolor="#ccffcc"
| 77 || April 1 || Atlanta Thrashers || 2 - 1 || Verizon Center ||  18,277 ||50-15-12 || 112
|- align="center" bgcolor="#ccffcc"
| 78 || April 3 || Columbus Blue Jackets || 3 - 2 || Nationwide Arena || 16,957 || 51-15-12 || 114
|- align="center" bgcolor="#ccffcc"
| 79 || April 5 || Boston Bruins || 3 - 2 OT || Verizon Center || 18,277 || 52-15-12 || 116
|- align="center" bgcolor="#ccffcc"
| 80 || April 6 || Pittsburgh Penguins || 6 - 3 || Mellon Arena || 17,132 || 53-15-12 || 118
|- align="center" bgcolor="#ccffcc"
| 81 || April 9 || Atlanta Thrashers || 5 - 2 || Verizon Center || 18,277 || 54-15-12 || 120
|- align="center"
| 82 || April 11 || Boston Bruins || 3-4 SO || Verizon Center || 18,277 || 54-15-13 || 121
|-

Playoffs 

On March 11, the Capitals clinched the division title for the third consecutive season after also winning division titles in the 2007–08 and 2008–09 campaigns. The Capitals also clinched as the Eastern Conference regular season champions. On April 4, the Capitals won their first ever Presidents' Trophy award. The Capitals played the Montreal Canadiens in the opening round. The Canadiens won Game 1, 3–2 in overtime. The Capitals won the next three games to take a 3–1 series lead. The Canadiens won the next two games to tie the series at 3–3 and force a Game 7. In Game 7, the Canadiens took a 2–0 lead, which held up until the third period. The Capitals came close many times and outshot the Canadiens 42 to 16, but Canadiens goaltender Jaroslav Halak kept them in the game, only allowing one goal. The Canadiens won the game 2–1 and eliminated the Capitals in the first round, considered one of the biggest playoff upsets in NHL history.

Key:  Win  Loss  Clinch Playoff Series  Eliminated from playoffs

Player statistics

Skaters
Note: GP = Games played; G = Goals; A = Assists; Pts = Points; +/− = Plus/minus; PIM = Penalty minutes

Goaltenders
Note: GP = Games played; Min = Time on ice (minutes); W = Wins; L = Losses; OT = Overtime losses; GA = Goals against; GAA= Goals against average; SA= Shots against; SV= Saves; Sv% = Save percentage; SO= Shutouts

†Denotes player spent time with another team before joining Capitals. Stats reflect time with the Capitals only.
‡Traded mid-season
Bold/italics denotes franchise record

Awards and records

Awards

Transactions
The Capitals have been involved in the following transactions during the 2009–10 season.

Trades

|}

Free agents acquired

Free agents lost

Claimed via waivers

Lost via waivers

Player signings

Draft picks 
The Capitals' picks in the 2009 NHL Entry Draft, in Montreal, Quebec on June 26–27, 2009.

Farm teams

Hershey Bears 
The Capitals' American Hockey League affiliate will remain to be the Hershey Bears in the 2009–10 season.

South Carolina Stingrays 
The South Carolina Stingrays remain Washington's ECHL affiliate for the 2009–10 season.

See also 
 2009–10 NHL season

References

External links
 2009–10 Washington Capitals season at ESPN
 2009–10 Washington Capitals season at Hockey Reference

W
W
Washington Capitals seasons
Presidents' Trophy seasons
Cap
Cap